The 1972 AFC Asian Cup Final was a football match which determined the winner of the 1972 AFC Asian Cup, the 5th edition of the AFC Asian Cup, a quadrennial tournament contested by the men's national teams of the member associations of the Asian Football Confederation. It was the first time that a final match was held in AFC Asian Cup. Because the previous four editions were held by round-robin format. The match was won by Iran, defeating South Korea 2–1 after extra time to win their second AFC Asian Cup.

Venue

The National Stadium, located in Bangkok, Thailand, hosted the 1972 AFC Asian Cup Final. The 19,793-seat stadium was built in 1937. It was only stadium used to host the 1972 Asian Cup; all matches were played in this stadium.

Route to the final

Match

Details

References

External links 
 

Final
Iran national football team matches
South Korea national football team matches
1972 in Thailand
1972
May 1972 sports events in Asia
Sports competitions in Thailand